State Road 369 (NM 369) is a  state highway in the US state of New Mexico. NM 369's western terminus is at U.S. Route 84 (US 84) and US 285 in San Pedro, and the eastern terminus is at US 84 and US 285 in San Pedro.

Major intersections

See also

References

369
Transportation in Rio Arriba County, New Mexico